Tea in the Harem is a 1985 film directed by Mehdi Charef, based on a book written by Charef in 1983. It was screened in the Un Certain Regard section at the 1985 Cannes Film Festival. The film won the Prix Jean Vigo in 1985.

Cast
 Kader Boukhanef - Madjid
 Rémi Martin - Pat
 Laure Duthilleul - Josette
 Saïda Bekkouche - Malika
 Nicole Hiss - Solange
 Brahim Ghenaim - The father
 Nathalie Jadot - Chantal
 Frédéric Ayivi - Bengston
 Pascal Dewaeme - Thierry
 Albert Delpy - Pelletier
 Sandrine Dumas - Anita
 Bourlem Guerdjou - Bibiche
 Jean-Pierre Sobeaux - Jean-Marc
 Nicolas Wostrikoff - Stéphane

Notes

References

External links

1985 films
French drama films
1980s French-language films
1985 drama films
Films directed by Mehdi Charef
Best First Feature Film César Award winners
1985 directorial debut films
Le Thé au harem d'Archimède
1980s French films